Guangqumennei Station is a station on Line 7 of the Beijing Subway.

Station layout 
The station has an underground island platform.

Exits 
There are 3 exits, lettered A, B, and D. Exits A and D are accessible.

References

Beijing Subway stations in Dongcheng District
Railway stations in China opened in 2014